Malhaha is one of the seven districts on the island of Rotuma, a dependency of Fiji. It includes the villages of Pepheua, Elsee, and Elsio. It is here that Raho, the founder of Rotuma, established his residence.

References

Districts of Rotuma